Bostrycapulus, commonly known as the spiny slipper snails, is a genus of sea snails, marine gastropod mollusks in the family Calyptraeidae, the slipper snails, cup-and-saucer snails and  hat snails.

Before 2005, the snails in this genus were all thought to belong to one species, which was known as Crepidula aculeata, the spiny slipper snail.
However, morphological and DNA sequence data show that the spiny slipper snails are a monophyletic group that is more closely related to Crepipatella than it is to Crepidula.

Taxonomy

Taxonomic history 
All of the species within the genus Bostrycapulus were previously assigned to a single species, Crepidula aculeata. However, molecular phylogenetic and anatomical work have shown them to be a separate monophyletic grouping or clade, which has elevated them to the genus status. DNA sequence data has also been used in combination with embryological observations to distinguish 8 species.

Species 
Species within the genus Bostrycapulus  include:
 Bostrycapulus aculeatus (Gmelin, 1791) - type species
 Bostrycapulus calyptraeformis (Deshayes, 1830)
 Bostrycapulus gravispinosus (Kuroda and Habe, 1950)
 Bostrycapulus heteropoma Collin & Rolán, 2010
 Bostrycapulus latebrus Collin, 2005
 Bostrycapulus odites Collin, 2005
 Bostrycapulus pritzkeri Collin, 2005
 Bostrycapulus tegulicius (Rochebrune, 1883)
 Bostrycapulus urraca Collin, 2005

References 

 Collin R. 2005. Development, phylogeny, and taxonomy of Bostrycapulus (Caenogastropoda: Calyptraeidae), an ancient cryptic radiation. Zoological Journal of the Linnean Society 144(1): 75-101

External links

 http://www.stri.si.edu/sites/collinlab/tree_species/bostrycapulus.html
 http://www.stri.si.edu/sites/collinlab/tree_species/main.html

Calyptraeidae